XHXZ-FM is a regional Mexican radio station in Apizaco, Tlaxcala.

History
XHXZ came to air on December 17, 1980, becoming the first FM station in the state of Tlaxcala and just the third broadcasting station in the entire state. Alfonso Macias Galáviz, who had a hand in founding the other two — XEHT-AM and XETT-AM — had been seeking a station for the town since 1977 and finally brought it to air. In April 1981, XHXZ received its concession and was formally opened by Governor Tulio Hernández Gómez. The original concessionaire was Ruben Contreras Santiago, who transferred control to a corporation in 1988.

References

Regional Mexican radio stations
Radio stations in Tlaxcala